Herpetoichthys fossatus, the Mustachioed snake-eel, is a species of eel in the family Ophichthidae. It is the only member of its genus. It is found in the Gulf of California.

References

Ophichthidae
Fish described in 1941